NFEPP (N-(3-fluoro-1-phenethylpiperidin-4-yl)-N-phenylpropionamide) is an analgesic opioid chemical, similar in structure to fentanyl, designed in 2016 by Spahn et al. from Free University of Berlin to avoid the standard negative side effects of opiates, including opioid overdose, by only targeting inflamed tissue.

Inflamed tissue 

Inflamed tissue has a lower pH value (~5–7) than non-inflamed tissue (7.4). Through computer simulation, scientists found a way to make the fentanyl analog only affect inflamed tissue via the addition of fluorine to the chemical structure. In experiment, it was shown that NFEPP produced injury-restricted analgesia in rats with different types of inflammatory pain without exhibiting typical opiate effects, including respiratory depression, sedation, constipation, and chemical seeking behavior.

As a result, NFEPP has the potential to reduce opioid addiction and dependency, as there is no effect on users who are not actually suffering from pain, as the chemical does not interact with non-inflamed brain tissue until much higher doses are reached.

References 

General anesthetics
Synthetic opioids
Piperidines
Anilides
Propionamides
Mu-opioid receptor agonists
Analgesics